Bayleaf is the first studio album by American musician Stone Gossard, best known as the guitarist for Pearl Jam. It was released on September 11, 2001, on Epic Records.

Overview 
The album features ten songs written over a span of four to five years. The album was recorded by Gossard over a -year period in Seattle, Washington and completed in 2001. Gossard worked with producer Pete Droge. Gossard sang lead vocals on seven out of the album's ten tracks, while guest vocalists Pete Droge and Ty Willman sang on the remaining three tracks. Gossard also contributed drums and piano to the album, as well as guitar, bass and vocals. Former Pearl Jam drummer Matt Chamberlain contributed his drumming to two tracks, "Bore Me" and "Fits". The album was mixed by Matt Bayles. The album's cover art was illustrated by Beth Haidle. The album's songs feature a mellow sound influenced by Frank Black, Rufus Wainwright, and The Rolling Stones. The album charted at number 37 on Billboard'''s Top Heatseekers chart. Greg Prato of AllMusic said, "While not as strong as his output with Brad, Bayleaf'' still has its moments."

Track listing 

Japanese bonus track

Online bonus track

Personnel 
 Stone Gossard – vocals, electric and acoustic guitars, bass guitar, piano, drums, percussion, conga, background vocals

Additional musicians and production
 Zac Baird – Nord Lead synthesizer
 Matt Bayles – keyboards, engineering, mixing
 Edward Brooks at RFI CD Mastering – mastering
 Matt Chamberlain – drums on "Bore Me" and "Fits"
 Tony Coleman – tambourine, percussion
 Guy M. Davis – bass guitar, background vocals
 Mike Dillon – vibraphone
 Pete Droge – background vocals, 12-string guitar, Prophet 5 synthesizer, slide guitar, clavinet, mellotron, guitar, bass guitar, keyboards, acoustic guitar, production
 Beth Haidle – artwork and photo transfer
 Paul Haidle – CD artwork
 Brad Klausen – design and layout
 Lance Mercer – photos
 Mike Stone – drums
 Ron Weinstein – piano, Hammond C3 organ
 Ty Willman – lead vocals on "Cadillac", "Unhand Me", and "Fend It Off", background vocals
 Steve Wilmans – engineering on "Hellbent"

Chart positions

References 

2001 debut albums
Epic Records albums
Stone Gossard albums